R.G. & G.R. Harris Funeral Homes Inc. v. Equal Employment Opportunity Commission, 590 U.S. ___ (2020), is a landmark United States Supreme Court case which ruled that Title VII of the Civil Rights Act of 1964 protects transgender people from employment discrimination.

Aimee Stephens was a funeral home employee who had presented herself as male up until 2013. On July 31, 2013, she wrote to her employer, the Harris Funeral Homes group, so that they could be prepared for her decision to undergo gender reassignment surgery, telling them that after a vacation, she planned to return dressed in female attire that otherwise followed the employee handbook. She was fired shortly after the letter was sent, and the Equal Employment Opportunity Commission helped to represent Stephens in court. The District Court ruled for the funeral homes, stating Title VII did not cover transgender people and that as a religious organization under the Religious Freedom Restoration Act, the company had a right to dismiss Stephens for non-conformity. The Sixth Circuit Court of Appeals reversed the decision, concluding Title VII did include protection for transgender people, which Harris Funeral Homes petitioned the Supreme Court to review. About a month before the Supreme Court decision, Stephens died from health complications. Representation of her case continued through her estate.

The case was heard on October 8, 2019, alongside two other cases, Bostock v. Clayton County and Altitude Express, Inc. v. Zarda which dealt with Title VII protection related to sexual orientation. The Court ruled in a 6–3 decision under Bostock but covering all three cases on June 15, 2020, that Title VII protection extends to gay and transgender people.

Case background 

In the United States, the Civil Rights Act of 1964 is a landmark piece of legislation to prevent discrimination across race, color, religion, sex, or national origin. Among its titles include Title VII, relating to equal employment opportunities and employment discrimination, with the same classes protected against discrimination in employment as well. However, at issue has remained how the Act covers the areas of gender identity as well as sexual orientation as they are not mentioned explicitly. This has led to disjointed coverage of LGBT and gender identity rights with some states issuing specific anti-discrimination for these groups. At the federal level, the House of Representatives has passed a 2019 amendment to the Act, the Equality Act, to explicitly grant these classes protection from discrimination under the Civil Rights Act, but such legislation has yet to be ratified by the Senate as of May 2020.

Stephens considered herself a transgender woman for most of her adult life but presented herself as a male, which reportedly caused her constant emotional stress. In 2013, she decided to come out to family and friends, and arranged to undergo reassignment surgery within the next year, expressing herself as a woman prior to transition as part of real-life experience. At that time, she had been an employee of R.G. &. G.R. Harris Funeral Homes for six years, and had an excellent work record. She wrote her supervisor regarding this matter prior to taking a vacation from work, and as to help with the transition, she would return to work in attire appropriate for female employees as outlined in their employee handbook. Two weeks later, Stephens was notified by mail that she had been terminated by the funeral home's owner, Thomas Rost. They attempted to mediate an amicable departure, with Rost offering Stephens a severance package, but she refused to take it.

Stephens filed a complaint with the Equal Employment Opportunity Commission (EEOC), believing she had been discriminated against due to being transgender. EEOC agreed and took the case against the funeral home to the United States District Court for the Eastern District of Michigan. There in 2016, the district court found for the funeral home on two bases: first, that in Title VII neither transgender persons nor gender identity were protected classes, and second, that because Rost was a devout Christian who does not accept that one can change one's gender, and ran the homes under his religion, that the Religious Freedom Restoration Act gave him the ability to fire Stephens if she would not conform.

The EEOC appealed to the Sixth Circuit. In March 2018, the Sixth Circuit reversed the decision, ruling that Title VII's "discrimination by sex" does include transgender persons. The court also considered that the funeral home had failed to show how the Civil Rights Act burdened Rost from expressing his religious freedom. Part of the Sixth's decision rested on the 1989 case Price Waterhouse v. Hopkins which states that employers cannot discriminate against employees for failure to conform to the stereotypical behavior of a man or woman. The case revolves around protections relating to public and private employees from being discriminated upon because of sex and whether this applies to gender identity for transgender persons.

In May 2020, before the Supreme Court had issued a decision, Stephens entered hospice care, as her long-term kidney disease had become untreatable. She died on May 12, 2020, at age 59. Stephens's lawyers, from the American Civil Liberties Union, said that the case would be carried on by her estate.

Supreme Court 
The funeral home was represented by the Alliance Defending Freedom, an American conservative Christian legal advocacy group involved in multiple transgender rights cases. They filed a petition in the U.S. Supreme Court for a writ of certiorari, asking the Court to hear the case.  There had been a circuit split on the issue of whether Title VII protects employees from employment discrimination based on sexual orientation. The Second Circuit in Zarda v. Altitude Express, Inc. and the Seventh Circuit in Hively v. Ivy Tech Community College found that the Title VII protects employees from discrimination on the basis of sexual orientation; the Eleventh Circuit in Bostock v. Clayton County, Georgia came to the opposite conclusion. The U.S. Department of Justice filed a brief with the Supreme Court in October 2018 arguing that the Sixth Circuit had decided wrongly and that Harris Funeral Homes had a right to fire an employee for being transgender.

The Court granted the cert petition (agreeing to hear the appeal) for Harris Funeral Homes in April 2019, alongside a pair of cases consolidated under Bostock which raised the same question related to Title VII discrimination against sexual orientation. Harris and these cases were heard on October 8, 2019. In oral arguments, the Court's conservative justices argued that because Congress had not included gender identity at the time of the Civil Rights Act and had not updated the law to include it, the Court should not create new law beyond Congress's intentions. Arguments also centered on how the word "sex" in Title VII could be interpreted to include transgender individuals.

Decision

See also
 List of LGBT-related cases in the United States Supreme Court

References

External links
 
 Biskupic, Joan (July 28, 2020): EXCLUSIVE: Anger, leaks and tensions at the Supreme Court during the LGBTQ rights case. A background article written by CNN's legal analyst & Supreme Court biographer Joan Biskupic who details the decision-making process leading to the landmark court decision in R.G. & G.R. Harris Funeral Homes Inc. v. Equal Employment Opportunity Commission. Archived from the original on November 13, 2020. Retrieved on November 24, 2020.

Discrimination against transgender people
Minority rights case law
United States employment discrimination case law
United States Supreme Court cases
United States transgender rights case law
United States gender discrimination case law
2020 in LGBT history